Vernon Township is one of thirteen townships in Washington County, Indiana, United States. As of the 2010 census, its population was 669 and it contained 261 housing units.

Geography

Unincorporated towns
 Claysville at 
 Smedley at 
(This list is based on USGS data and may include former settlements.)

Adjacent townships
 Brown Township (north)
 Jefferson Township (northeast)
 Washington Township (east)
 Howard Township (southeast)
 Madison Township (south)
 Stampers Creek Township, Orange County (southwest)
 Northeast Township, Orange County (west)

Cemeteries
The township contains these three cemeteries: Hamilton, Mount Tabor and Old Smedley.

School districts
 West Washington School Corporation

Political districts
 Indiana's 9th congressional district
 State House District 73
 State Senate District 44

References
 United States Census Bureau 2007 TIGER/Line Shapefiles
 United States Board on Geographic Names (GNIS)
 IndianaMap

External links
 Indiana Township Association
 United Township Association of Indiana

Townships in Washington County, Indiana
Townships in Indiana